Rio, I Love You is a 2014 Brazilian anthology film starring an ensemble cast of actors of various nationalities. It's the fourth film in the Cities of Love franchise (following 2006's Paris, je t'aime, the 2008 film New York, I Love You, and Tbilisi, I Love You released earlier in 2014), created and produced by Emmanuel Benbihy.

Production
The participating directors were Brazilians Carlos Saldanha (Ice Age and Rio), José Padilha (Elite Squad), Andrucha Waddington (The House of Sand) and Fernando Meirelles (City of God), the Lebanese director Nadine Labaki (Caramel), the Mexican screenwriter Guillermo Arriaga (Babel), the Australian director Stephan Elliott (The Adventures of Priscilla, Queen of the Desert), the Italian director Paolo Sorrentino (The Great Beauty), the American actor and director John Turturro, and the South Korean director Im Sang-soo (A Good Lawyer's Wife, The Housemaid).

The opening and closing sequences, plus the transitions were directed by Brazilian Vicente Amorim, while musician Gilberto Gil composed the theme song.

Those responsible for producing the film, among them Rio Filme, disclosed that the cost of production was R$20 million.

Segments

Economic response
In 2016, U.S. Theatrical and DVD receipts were $60,000.

Critical response
Rio, I Love You received largely negative reviews from critics. On the review aggregator site Rotten Tomatoes, the film holds an 8% "rotten" rating based on 25 reviews, with an average rating of 3.55 out of 10. Pat Padua of The Washington Post said "the film is wonderful to look at. It’s just that the writing is consistently terrible". Ben Kenigsberg of The New York Times heavily criticized the film's lack of cohesion and its adherence to tourist-friendly depictions of Rio de Janeiro. He also noted it has the corporate sponsorship of Fiat, Unilever and others. Miami New Times' Kenji Fujishima calls it a "barrel-scraping collective project." Eye For Films Andrew Robertson rated it two stars and calls it "baffling in construction and execution" The Hollywood Reporter's unattributed review says "The only people sure to love this concoction are those working for Rio’s tourism bureau, which may well have picked the camera’s vantage points for many lush and lovely overhead shots of the city’s distinctive terrain."

References

External links
 

2014 films
Brazilian anthology films
Brazilian romantic drama films
Films set in Rio de Janeiro (city)
Films shot in Rio de Janeiro (city)
Films with screenplays by Paolo Sorrentino